The Little Golden Calf (Zolotoy telyonok) is a satirical novel by Soviet authors Ilf and Petrov, published in 1931. Its main character, Ostap Bender, also appears in a previous novel by the authors called The Twelve Chairs. The title alludes to the "golden calf" of the Bible.

Plot summary
Ostap Bender is still alive (but sports a scar across his neck), after barely surviving the assassination attempt in the previous book, which he once briefly mentions as "stupid business". This time he hears a story about a "clandestine millionaire" named Alexandr Koreiko. Koreiko has made millions through various illegal enterprises by taking advantage of the widespread corruption in the New Economic Policy (NEP) period while pretending to live on an office clerk's salary of 46 rubles a month. Koreiko lives in Chernomorsk (literally: Black Sea city, referring to the city of Odesa) and keeps his large stash of ill-gotten money in a suitcase, waiting for the fall of the Soviet government, so that he can make use of it.

Together with two petty criminals Balaganov and Panikovsky, and an extremely naive and innocent car driver Kozlevich, Bender finds out about Koreiko and starts to collect all the information he can get on his business activities. Koreiko tries to flee, but Bender eventually tracks him down in Turkestan, on the newly built Turkestan–Siberia Railway. He then blackmails him into giving him a million rubles.

Suddenly rich, Bender faces the problem of how to spend his money in a Communist country where there are no legal millionaires. Nothing of the life of the rich that Bender dreamt of seems possible in the Soviet Union. Frustrated, Bender even decides to anonymously donate the money to the Ministry of Finance, but changes his mind. He turns the money into jewels and gold, and tries to cross the Romanian border, only to be robbed by the Romanian border guards, leaving him only with a medal, the Order of the Golden Fleece.

Main characters 

Ostap Ibragimovich Bender, the main character and protagonist
Shura Balaganov, the second "Son of Lieutenant Schmidt"
Mikhail Samuelevich Panikovsky, the third "Son of Lieutenant Schmidt"
Adam Kazimirovich Kozlevich, a "Wildebeest" taxi driver
Alexandr Ivanovich Koreiko, a millionaire

Two endings 

There are two alternative endings to The Golden Calf. One was written at the time the novel was originally submitted for publication to the Thirty Days magazine. The other appeared later, probably due to the objections to the writers for lionizing their main character. According to the first, Ostap Bender, after obtaining his "million", gets to know the sorrow of a lonely man who has fulfilled his purpose, renounces the fortune, and marries his beloved, Zoya Sinitskaya. In the second, he is torn. At first, he returns his "million" to the Commissariat of Finance, but then changes his mind. Determined to travel to Rio de Janeiro, he is caught crossing the Romanian border and sent back home, after being deprived of his fortune by Romanian border guards.
 
“No ovations! I failed to become the Count of Monte Cristo. I’ll have to retrain as an apartment manager”. (the 1932 English translation reads: "I shall have to qualify as a janitor")

Cultural influence
The book contributed a number of catchphrases and colorful terms into the Russian language, such as "Horns and Hoofs company ("Рога и копыта")" and "Children of Lieutenant Schmidt", see the Wikiquote page for the book for more.

Adaptations
Mikhail Schweitzer made a black-and-white film The Golden Calf (1968) with Sergey Yursky as Bender. It was adapted as Mechty Idiota (Idiot's Dreams, 1993) by director Vasili Pichul, starring pop singer Sergei Krylov as Bender. 
The Russian Channel One aired an eight-part TV series  (2006) starring Oleg Menshikov as Bender. Miklós Szinetár directed a 3.30 hours Hungarian adaptation TV-series Aranyborjú(1974) starring Iván Darvas as Ostap Bender.
The 2009 translation into English, The Little Golden Calf by Annie O. Fisher (published by Russian Life Books) was the first unabridged, uncensored translation into English of the novel. The translation won the 2010 AATSEEL Award for Best Translation into English from any Slavic Language.

References

External links

Full Russian text at lib.ru
Free online English translation (in progress)

Soviet novels
1931 Russian novels
Collaborative novels
Russian comedy novels
Russian novels adapted into films
Ukrainian comedy novels
Ukrainian novels adapted into films
Novels set in Odesa
Ilf and Petrov
Picaresque novels
Russian satirical novels
Russian novels adapted into television shows
Bureaucracy in fiction